Eignblunzn (also known as Viennese Factionism: Eignblunzn or auto blood sausage) is a 2003 performance by Austrian art theory group monochrom and is considered an important work in the group's history and Austrian art history in the 2000s. The group's members Johannes Grenzfurthner, Evelyn Fürlinger and Harald Homolka-List staged a classic Austrian Heuriger (wine tavern) in a room at Museumsquartier Vienna, and consumed Austrian-style blood sausage made out of their own blood. Volunteers were invited to take part. German author Johannes Ullmaier and Austrian journalist Gerlinde Lang of radio station FM4 joined the procedure and reported about it. The performance was accompanied by political essays about the 'auto-cannibalistic' tendencies of the global economy. The event also can be interpreted as a critical statement about art, art history, the art market, and martialism in performance art (see: Viennese Actionism).

The performance influenced other art and media projects, for example a 2017 TV show by Joko Winterscheidt and Klaas Heufer-Umlauf featuring monochrom member Günther Friesinger, and was re-staged in 2018 at Urania Kino in Vienna.

Bibliography

Auto-Cannibalism Between the Destruction of Heroes and the Deconstruction of Myths. Paralipomena on the monochrom performance Eigenblunzn. Thomas Ballhausen in the reader "Context Hacking", 2013.

External links
monochrom's Viennese Factionism project page

References

Performances
2003 works
2003 in art
Body art
Monochrom